Mallalieu is a surname, and may refer to:

 Albert Mallalieu (1904–1991) English cricketer
 Ann Mallalieu, Baroness Mallalieu (born 1945) English politician and lawyer, daughter of William Mallalieu
 Aubrey Mallalieu (1873–1948) English actor
 Frederick Mallalieu (1860–1932) English politician; father of Lance and William Mallalieu
 Sir William Mallalieu (1908–1980) English politician
 Sir Lance Mallalieu (1905–1979) English politician
 Willard Francis Mallalieu (1828–1911) American Methodist bishop